Stefanowo may refer to the following places in Poland:
Stefanowo, Gmina Kazimierz Biskupi in Greater Poland Voivodeship
Stefanowo, Gmina Sompolno in Greater Poland Voivodeship
Stefanowo, Gostyń County in Greater Poland Voivodeship
Stefanowo, Koło County in Greater Poland Voivodeship
Stefanowo, Nowy Tomyśl County in Greater Poland Voivodeship
Stefanowo, Inowrocław County in Kuyavian-Pomeranian Voivodeship
Stefanowo, Radziejów County in Kuyavian-Pomeranian Voivodeship
Stefanowo, Włocławek County in Kuyavian-Pomeranian Voivodeship
Stefanowo, Masovian Voivodeship
Stefanowo, Podlaskie Voivodeship
Stefanowo, Kościerzyna County, Pomeranian Voivodeship
Stefanowo, Puck County in Pomeranian Voivodeship
Stefanowo, Warmian-Masurian Voivodeship